Sophia Dorothea of Brunswick-Lüneburg-Celle (15 September 1666 – 13 November 1726) was the repudiated wife of future King George I of Great Britain. The union with George, her first cousin, was a marriage of state, arranged by her father George William, her father-in-law the Elector of Hanover, and her mother-in-law, Electress Sophia of Hanover, first cousin of King Charles II of England. Sophia Dorothea is best remembered for her alleged affair with Count Philip Christoph von Königsmarck that led to her being imprisoned in the Castle of Ahlden for the last thirty years of her life.

Life

Early years
Born in Celle on 15 September 1666, Sophia Dorothea was the only surviving daughter of George William, Duke of Brunswick-Lüneburg, by his morganatic wife Eléonore Desmier d'Olbreuse (1639–1722), Lady of Harburg, a French Huguenot noblewoman. Sophia Dorothea appears to have grown up in a carefree and loving environment. 

Her father transferred large assets to her over time in order to improve her chances as a candidate for marriage. Her status was enhanced, and her chances were further improved, when, by imperial order dated 22 July 1674, and in recognition of the military assistance given by her father to Emperor Leopold I, she and her mother received the title of Countess of Harburg and Wilhelmsburg" (Gräfin von Harburg und Wilhelmsburg) with allodial rights over those demesnes.

Sophia Dorothea's suitors included Augustus Frederick, Hereditary Prince of Brunswick-Wolfenbüttel; Frederick Charles, Duke of Württemberg-Winnental; Maximilian II Emanuel, Elector of Bavaria; and King Charles XI of Sweden. At first, her parents agreed to marriage between Sophia Dorothea and the Hereditary Prince of Brunswick-Wolfenbüttel, who was the eldest son of their distant relative Anthony Ulrich, Duke of Brunswick-Wolfenbüttel, who had supported the love affair between George William and Éléonore from its beginning. The betrothal was signed on 20 December 1675, but the prospective groom was mortally wounded at the siege of Philippsburg on 9 August 1676.

Elevation of birth status and marriage
After the death of his daughter's fiancé, George William sought to negotiate an agreement on the inheritance of the Duchy of Lüneburg. He initially approached his younger brother Ernest Augustus, Elector of Brunswick-Lüneburg, to arrange a marriage between Sophia Dorothea and Ernest Augustus's eldest son George Louis, the future King George I of Great Britain. However, both his brother and his sister-in-law, Sophia of the Palatinate, had misgivings about the proposed match because of the circumstances of Sophia Dorothea's birth.

After the rejection of his daughter, George William decided to improve the status of Sophia Dorothea and her mother. By contract signed on 22 August 1675, and in open violation of his previous promise never to marry, George William declared that Éléonore was his lawful wife, and a second wedding ceremony was held at Celle on 2 April 1676. Ernest Augustus and Sophia stayed away from this second wedding. Twenty-two days later, on 24 April, Eléonore began to be addressed at court as Duchess of Brunswick and Sophia Dorothea became legitimate. 

This development alarmed George William's relatives because it appeared to threaten the planned union of the Lüneburg territories. By an agreement signed on 13 July 1680, the Lüneburg ruling family recognised Éléonore as Duchess of Brunswick and Sophia Dorothea as Princess of Brunswick-Lüneburg-Celle, with all appertaining rights of birth. George Louis's parents also agreed to the proposed union of their son with Sophia Dorothea. In the teeth of opposition from both Sophia Dorothea herself and from her mother, George William went ahead with arrangements for the wedding.

The wedding took place on 21 November 1682. The marriage was a complete failure. George Louis and his mother, Sophia of the Palatinate, felt only contempt for Sophia Dorothea, believing that her birth and manners were inferior. Explaining her reluctant support for the marriage, Duchess Sophia wrote to her niece Elizabeth Charlotte, Duchess of Orléans:

George Louis treated his bride with coldness and frequently scolded her for her lack of etiquette. The two had loud and bitter arguments. Nevertheless, they managed to conceive two children: George Augustus (the future King George II of Great Britain, born on 30 October 1683) and Sophia Dorothea (the future Queen Consort in Prussia and Electress Consort of Brandenburg, born on 16 March 1687). Having done his duty, George Louis acquired a mistress, Melusine von der Schulenburg, and started to neglect his wife. His parents asked him to be more circumspect with his mistress, fearful that disruption of the marriage would threaten the payment of the 100,000 thalers he was to receive as part of Sophia Dorothea's dowry and inheritance from her father.

Affair with Königsmarck

Around 1690, Sophia Dorothea was reunited with the Swedish Count Philip Christoph von Königsmarck, whom she had known in her childhood when he was a page at the court of Celle. At first, their meetings were brief and sporadic, but this probably changed in 1691. Initially, their closeness went unnoticed, but eventually the preference that Sophia Dorothea showed for Königsmarck aroused suspicion. By 1694 rumors filled the Hanoverian court that they were having a love affair. Contemporary sources show that Sophia Dorothea and Königsmarck were presumed to have had a sexual relationship since March 1692, though she consistently denied it throughout the rest of her life.

After a violent argument with her husband, Sophia Dorothea visited her parents in Celle in the spring of 1694 in the hope of persuading them to support her official separation from her husband. George William and Eléonore opposed it, however. Sophia Dorothea's father was waging war against Denmark and Sweden, and was dependent on the help of his brother. He sent his daughter back to Hanover.

In the summer of 1694 Sophia Dorothea, together with Königsmarck and her lady in waiting Eleonore von dem Knesebeck, planned an escape, hoping to find refuge either in Wolfenbüttel, under the protection of Duke Anthony Ulrich, or in the Electorate of Saxony, where Königsmarck was a major general in the cavalry.

Disappearance of Königsmarck
Countess Clara Elisabeth von Platen, a former mistress of Elector Ernest Augustus, had tried in January 1694 to persuade Königsmarck to marry her daughter Sophia Charlotte, but he had refused. Offended, she revealed to the Electoral Prince George Louis the love affair between his wife and Königsmarck, as well as their plan to escape.   

On the night of 11 July 1694, after a meeting with Sophia Dorothea in the Leineschloss, Königsmarck disappeared without a trace. It appears that he was killed on the orders, tacit or direct, of George Louis or his father the Elector, and that his body, weighted with stones, was thrown into the river Leine. Four of Ernest Augustus's courtiers are said to have committed the murder, and one of them, Don Nicolò Montalbano, received 150,000 thalers, about one hundred times the annual salary of the highest-paid official. No trace of Königsmarck was ever found.

King Louis XIV of France questioned his sister-in-law Elizabeth Charlotte, a maternal first cousin of George Louis, about the murder, but she pretended ignorance. Louis then sent agents to Hanover, but they could shed no more light on the mystery than King Augustus II of Poland and Saxony, who spent weeks searching for his missing general.

Ernest Augustus and his brother George William, Sophia Dorothea's father, made a formal complaint to Emperor Leopold I against Augustus II's "unfriendly acts" and threatened to withdraw their troops from the Grand Alliance in the war against France. Both the Emperor and the Elector Frederick III of Brandenburg exerted pressure on Augustus II, but the Polish envoy continued his investigation and even told Count von Platen that Königsmarck had either been captured or killed on the orders of his wife the Countess, out of jealousy.

In 2016, construction workers installing an elevator in the Leineschloss found human bones in a pit. These were initially assumed to be Königsmarck's remains, but examination suggested that it is unlikely.

Love letters between Sophia Dorothea and Königsmarck
When his affair with Sophia Dorothea was about to become public, Königsmarck handed their love letters to his brother-in-law, the Swedish Count Carl Gustav von Löwenhaupt. The latter's heirs later offered to sell the correspondence to the House of Hanover, but they demanded such a high price that the court rejected the offer and questioned the authenticity of the letters. The correspondence was published in the middle of the 19th century. The majority of the letters are now in the possession of Lund University in Sweden, although a few ended up in the possession of Sophia Dorothea's grandson, King Frederick the Great of Prussia, after his sister, the Swedish Queen consort Louisa Ulrika, allegedly stole them and sent them to him. Today the authenticity of the letters has been established beyond any doubt.

The lovers rarely dated their letters, but they numbered most of them. The Hanoverian historian Georg Schnath calculated on the basis of the existing correspondence that there were originally 340 letters written by Königsmarck and 320 written by Sophia Dorothea. The missing letters seem to have been confiscated and destroyed by the Hanoverian authorities after the affair became public. The State Archives in Hanover provide scant information about the critical years. Even the correspondence between the Electress Sophia and her niece Elizabeth Charlotte, which might have shed some light on events, was censored afterwards.

Divorce and imprisonment

George Louis demanded a legal separation from his wife, citing her as sole culprit on grounds of desertion. During the divorce proceedings, he had Sophia Dorothea placed under arrest in Lauenau Castle. On 28 December 1694, the dissolution of the marriage was pronounced, and Sophia Dorothea was named as the guilty party for "maliciously leaving her husband". She was forbidden to remarry or to see her children again; her name was removed from official documents, she was stripped of her title of Electoral Princess, and churches in Hanover were no longer to mention her name in prayers. After the divorce, George Louis sent her to Ahlden House, a stately home on the Lüneburg Heath, which served as a prison appropriate to her status.

At the behest of her former husband and with the consent of her father, Sophia Dorothea was imprisoned for life. George Louis confiscated the assets she had brought into the marriage and allocated her an annual maintenance. She initially received 8,000 thalers for herself and her court, which was later raised to 28,000 thalers, a sum which George Louis and her father George William paid in equal parts. She was detained in the north wing of the castle, a two-story half-timbered building, and guarded 24 hours a day by 40 men at arms, five to ten of whom were on duty at any one time. Her mail and visits were strictly controlled, though her mother had unlimited visiting rights. As far as anyone knows, she never attempted to escape.

Initially, Sophia Dorothea was allowed only to walk unaccompanied inside the mansion's courtyard. Later, she was permitted to enter the gardens under guard. After the first two years, she was permitted to make supervised journeys of up to two kilometres outside the walls. Her stay in Ahlden was interrupted several times because of war or when renovation of the residence was under way. During these times she was transferred to Celle Castle or to Essel. Her entourage comprised two ladies in waiting, several chambermaids, and other household and kitchen staff, all selected for their loyalty to Hanover.

After her imprisonment, Sophia Dorothea was known as Duchess of Ahlden. At first, she was extremely apathetic and resigned to her fate, but in later years she tried to obtain her release. After her former father-in-law died, in 1698, she sent a letter of condolence to her former husband, assuring him that "she prayed for him every day and begged him on her knees to forgive her mistakes. She will be eternally grateful to him if he allows her to see her two children." She also wrote a letter of condolence to the Electress Sophia, her former mother-in-law, claiming that she wanted nothing more than "to kiss Your Highness's hands before I die". Neither George Louis nor Sophia responded.

When Sophia Dorothea's father was on his deathbed, in 1705, he wanted to see his daughter one last time, to reconcile with her, but his chief minister, Count Bernstorff, objected, claiming that a meeting could lead to diplomatic problems with Hanover. George William died without seeing his daughter.

Sophia Dorothea is remembered for a significant act of charity during her imprisonment: after a devastating fire of Ahlden in 1715, she contributed considerable sums of money towards the rebuilding of the town.

Death and burial
The death of her mother in 1722 left Sophia Dorothea alone. When Sophia Dorothea's daughter, the Queen in Prussia, travelled to Hanover in 1725 to see her father, by then King George I of Great Britain, Sophia Dorothea, dressed even more carefully than usual, waited every day at the window of her residence, hoping in vain to see her daughter.

Sophia Dorothea grew overweight, and was frequently plagued by febrile colds and indigestion. In early 1726, she suffered a stroke; in August of that year she went to bed with a severe colic, and refused all food and treatment. She died shortly before midnight on 13 November 1726, aged 60. An autopsy revealed liver failure and gall bladder occlusion due to 60 gallstones. Her former husband placed an announcement in The London Gazette to the effect that the Duchess of Ahlden had died, but he forbade mourning in either London or Hanover. He was furious when he heard that the members of his daughter's court in Berlin were wearing black.

The guards at Ahlden placed Sophia Dorothea's corpse in a lead coffin and deposited it in a cellar. In January 1727 an order came from London that she be buried without any ceremony in the cemetery of Ahlden, which was impossible after weeks of heavy rain. The coffin was brought back to the cellar and covered in sand. Not until May 1727 was Sophia Dorothea buried, secretly and at night, beside her parents in the Stadtkirche in Celle. George I died four weeks later while he was visiting Hanover.

Inheritance
Sophia Dorothea's parents seem to have believed to the last that their daughter would one day be released. In January 1705, shortly before her father's death, he and his wife drew up a joint will, under which their daughter was to receive the estates of Ahlden, Rethem and Walsrode, extensive estates in France, and Celle, her father's fortune and her mother's jewelry. Her father appointed Count Heinrich Sigismund von Bar as administrator of Sophia Dorothea's fortune. She named him as one of the main beneficiaries of her will, but he died six years before she did.

Related history
Eleonore von dem Knesebeck (1655–1717), Sophia Dorothea's lady-in-waiting and close confidant, was imprisoned in 1695 in Scharzfels Castle in the borough of Herzberg am Harz. After two years of solitary confinement, she managed to escape on 5 November 1697 and was able to flee to Wolfenbüttel under the protection of Duke Anthony Ulrich. She left a unique document in the room of the tower where she was confined: all the walls and doors were written down to the last corner with charcoal and chalk. The texts (sacred poems in the style of contemporary church hymns), were accusations against her enemies at court and memoir-like prose pieces; all these were recorded for the Hanover archive files. Until her death, she denied the adulterous relationship between Sophia Dorothea and von Königsmarck.

A French adventurer, Marquis Armand de Lassay (1652–1738), claimed in his memoirs that he had received no fewer than thirteen love letters from Sophia Dorothea, but he never showed any documents to anyone.

Sophia Dorothea's great-granddaughter Caroline Matilda of Great Britain, Queen consort of Denmark and Norway (1751–1775) shared her fate. After the Struensee affair in 1772, she was divorced from her husband, separated from her children and sent to Celle Castle, where she died three years later. In the crypt of the Stadtkirche St. Marien, both women are united in death.

In 1804, Friedrich von Schiller planned a tragedy about Sophia Dorothea, to be called The Princess of Celle, but he never completed it.

Film
Sophia Dorothea's affair is the basis of the British film Saraband for Dead Lovers (1948), in which she is played by Joan Greenwood and Königsmarck is played by Stewart Granger.

References

Bibliography
 Ahlborn, Luise: Zwei Herzoginnen (in German). Janke ed., Berlin 1903 (published under the pseudonym "Louise Haidheim").
 
 
 
 Hisserich, Walther: Die Prinzessin von Ahlden und Graf Königsmarck in der erzählenden Dichtung. Ein Beitrag zur vergleichenden Literaturgeschichte (in German). Roether, Darmstadt 1906, DNB 574013725,  (Dissertation University of Rostock 1906, 50 pages online, HathiTrust Digital Library,2010. MiAaHDL, limited search only, use with USA proxy possible).
 
 
 Jordan, Ruth: Sophie Dorothea. Constable Books, London 1971.
 
 
 Leister, Dieter-Jürgen: Bildnisse der Prinzessin von Ahlden (in German), in: Niederdeutsche Beiträge zur Kunstgeschichte, vol. 9, 1970, pp. 169–178.
 
 Leslie, Doris: The Rebel Princess. Heinemann, London 1970.
 Mason, A. E. W.: Königsmarck. Hodder & Stoughton, London 1951 (Nachdr. d. Ausg. London 1938).
 Morand, Paul: Sophie Dorothea von Celle. Die Geschichte eines Lebens und einer Liebe ("Ci-gît Sophie-Dorothée de Celle", 1968) (in German). 2nd edition L. Brandt, Celle 1979, .
 Öztanil, Guido Erol: "All’ dies gleicht sehr einem Roman". Liebe, Mord und Verbannung: Die Prinzessin von Ahlden (1666–1726) und einige Seitenblicke auf die Geschichte des Fleckens Ahlden (in German). Walsrode 1994, 
 Schnath, Georg: Der Königsmarck-Briefwechsel. Korrespondenz der Prinzessin Sophie Dorothea von Hannover mit dem Grafen Philipp Christoph Konigsmarck 1690 bis 1694 (In German) (Quellen und Darstellungen zur Geschichte Niedersachsens; vol. 51). Lax, Hildesheim 1952 (critical complete edition in Regestenform).
 Scholz, Carsten Scholz; Seelke, Anja: Eine Liebe in Zeiten des Despotismus. Sophie Dorothea von Hannover und Philipp Christoph von Königsmarck in alten und zwei neuen Porträts. (in German) In: Celler Chronik 23. Celle 2016.
 Singer, Herbert: Die Prinzessin von Ahlden. Verwandlungen einer höfischen Sensation in der Literatur des 18. Jahrhunderts (in German). In: Euphorion. Zeitschrift für Literaturgeschichte, vol.  49 (1955), pp. 305–334, .
  Note: published without naming the author.
 von Ramdohr, Friedrich Wilhelm Basilius: Essai sur l'histoire de la princesse d' Ahlen, épouse du prince électoral d'Hanovre (...), Suard's Archives Littéraires 3, pp. 158–204, Paris and Tübingen 1804 (without mentioning the author); author identified according to source dated 1866 and by C. Haase in 1968.
 
 Wilkins, William H.: The Love of an Uncrowned Queen. Sophie Dorothea, consort of George I. and her correspondence with Philip Christopher Count Königsmarck. Hutchinson, London 1900.
  This work in turn cites:
W. F. Palmblad, ed., Briefwechsel des Grafen Königsmark and der Prinzessin Sophie Dorothea von Celle (Leipzig, 1847)
A. F. H. Schaumann, Sophie Dorothea Prinzessin von Ahlden
A. F. H. Schaumann, Kurfürstin Sophie von Hannover (Hanover, 1878)
C. L. von Pöllnitz, Histoire secrette de la duchesse d'Hanovre (London, 1732)
W. H. Wilkins, The Love of an Uncrowned Queen (London, 1900)
A. Köcher, "Die Prinzessin von Ahlden," in the Historische Zeitschrift (Munich, 1882)
Vicomte H. de Beaucaire, Une Mésalliance dans la maison de Brunswick (Paris, 1884)
Alice Drayton Greenwood, Lives of the Hanoverian Queens of England, vol. i (1909)

Works of fiction
 Anthony Ulrich, Duke of Brunswick-Wolfenbüttel: Römische Octavia (in German). Nürnberg 1685–1707, 7 vols.; Brunswick 1712.
 Hermann Schiff: Die Prinzessin von Ahlden oder Drei Prophezeiungen; ein Roman der Weltgeschichte (in German). Hoffmann & Campe, Hamburg 1855.
 Theodor Hemsen: Die Prinzessin von Ahlden. Historischer Roman (in German). Rümpler ed., Hannover 1869 (6 Bde.).
 Paul Burg: Des galanten Grafen Königsmarck letzte Liebes-Abenteuer. Ein Rokoko-Roman (in German). Stern Bücher ed. (Koch & Co.), Leipzig 1922.
 Helen Simpson: Saraband for dead Lovers. Tauchnitz, London 1935.
 Eleanor Hibbert: The Princess of Celle. Putnam Books, New York 1985,  (reprint of the London 1967 edition; published under the pseudonym "Jean Plaidy").
 Anny Wienbruch: Die ungekrönte Königin. Sophie Dorothea, die Gefangene von Ahlden (in German). St.-Johannis-Druckerei ed., Lahr-Dinglingen 1976, .
 Helene Lehr: Sophia Dorothea. Die verhängnisvolle Liebe der Prinzessin von Hannover; Roman (in German). Droemer Knaur, München 1994, .
 John Veale: Passion Royal. A novel. Book guild Publ., Lewes, Sussex 1997, .
 Dörte von Westernhagen: Und also lieb ich mein Verderben. Roman (in German). Wallstein ed., Göttingen 1997, .
 Heinrich Thies: Die verbannte Prinzessin. Das Leben der Sophie Dorothea; Romanbiografie (in German). 2 edition Klampen ed., Springe 2007, .
 Sargon Youkhana: Die Affäre Königsmarck. Historischer Roman. (in German). Ullstein Buchverlage GmbH, Berlin 2009, .

External links

 

1666 births
1726 deaths
New House of Lüneburg
People from Celle
Electoral Princesses of Hanover
George I of Great Britain
Daughters of monarchs